Arnold Vaino (26 June 1900, in Tartu – 15 March 1960, in Tallinn) was an Estonian actor and director.

From 1921 to 1932, he was an actor at Vanemuine Theatre and from 1932 to 1941, he worked at Estonia Theatre. Besides theatre roles he played also in films.

Filmography

 1927 Noored kotkad (feature film; role: student Tammekänd)
 1930 Vahva sõdur Joosep Toots (feature film; co-director and the role: Joosep Toots)
 1931 Kas tunned maad? (documentary film; role: ?)

References

1900 births
1960 deaths
Estonian male stage actors
Estonian male film actors
Estonian male silent film actors
20th-century Estonian male actors
Estonian theatre directors
Male actors from Tartu